Pembroke Finlayson (known as the "Midget Twirler") (July 31, 1888 in Cheraw, South Carolina – March 6, 1912 in Brooklyn, New York) was a pitcher in Major League Baseball. He pitched in the 1908 and 1909 seasons with the Brooklyn Superbas. While playing in the minors in 1910 he was diagnosed with a serious heart problem and underwent surgery. However, he attempted to return to baseball too soon into his recovery and died in 1912.

Notes

External links

Profile
 
 Biography at SABR.org

1888 births
1912 deaths
Baseball players from South Carolina
Major League Baseball pitchers
Brooklyn Superbas players
Brockton Tigers players
Rochester Bronchos players
Lawrence Colts players
Memphis Turtles players
Burials at Green-Wood Cemetery